Sanduo Shopping District is a station on the Red line of Kaohsiung MRT in Lingya District, Kaohsiung, Taiwan. The station is named after the Sanduo Shopping District.

Station Overview

The station is a two-level, underground station with an island platform and seven exits. It is 213 meters long and is located at the intersection of Zhongshan 2nd Rd. and Sanduo 3rd Rd.

The station is unique in the Kaohsiung MRT for two reasons. First, it is the only underground station with an open platform, allowing for passengers to see the platform directly from the lobby area (similar to many underground stations on the Taipei Metro). The other is the unique design of the elevator; the structure is incorporated both into the lighting on the ceiling as well as the platform level.

The station will be a transfer station with the Yellow line in the future.

Around the Station
 85 Sky Tower
 Chen Jhong-he Memorial Hall
 Kaohsiung Exhibition Center
 Singuang Ferry Wharf
 Sanduo Shopping Circle
 Singuang Boulevard
 Shin Kong Mitsukoshi Department Store
 Pacific SOGO Department Store
 Far Eastern Department Store, Vieshow Cinemas
 Wunheng Night Market
 Yisin Road
 Guangnan Sanduo Store
 Sanduo Cineplex
 Lingya Junior High School
 Lingjhou Elementary School
 Shihjia Park
 Shengrih Park (Birthday Park)
 Sihwei Park
 Hotel Sunshine Kaoshiung

References

2008 establishments in Taiwan
Kaohsiung Metro Red line stations
Lingya District
Railway stations opened in 2008